The Supreme Patriarch of Cambodia is the de facto leader of Buddhism in Cambodia.

Titles
The titles for the Cambodian Supreme Patriarchs are derived from Pali. The full official title of the Supreme Patriarch of the Maha Nikaya is Samdech Preah Sumedhādhipati; sumedhādhipati means 'wise lord'. In letters with King-Father Norodom Sihanouk, the following title is used for the Great Supreme Patriarch Tep Vong: Samdech Preah Agga Mahā Sangharājādhipati; which is translated as 'foremost great supreme patriarch leader'.

The full official title of the Supreme Patriarch of the Dhammayuttika Nikaya is Samdech Preah Aphiserei Sukonthea Mohasangreacheathipadei (Abhisirī Sugandhā Mahāsangharājādhipati). This title means 'Of Higher Merit and Pure Virtue, Great Supreme Patriarch Leader'. In letters with King-Father Sihanouk, an abbreviated title is used in the valediction: Samdech Preah Sangreach.'

History
Between 1855 and 1981, there were two Supreme Patriarchs in the Kingdom of Cambodia: one for the Cambodian branch of the Thai Dhammayuttika Nikaya order, and one for the Maha Nikaya. In 1981, under the supervision of the Vietnamese-backed People's Republic of Kampuchea, Venerable Tep Vong was elected Supreme Patriarch of a new, unified sangha modelled on the Vietnamese Theravada Buddhist Sangha Congregation.

After the signing of the Paris Peace Accords in 1991, King Norodom Sihanouk appointed Venerable Bour Kry as Supreme Patriarch of Dhammayuttika Nikaya. Today, the two orders are each headed by their own patriarch, unlike in Thailand where only one Supreme Patriarch heads both orders. The Constitution of Cambodia provides a seat on the Royal Council of the Throne to both Supreme Patriarchs, thus giving each a say in the selection of the Cambodian sovereign.

In 2006, Tep Vong was elevated to the status of Great Supreme Patriarch, while Venerable Non Nget was subsequently elevated to Supreme Patriarch of the Maha Nikaya. Tep Vong is the first monk in 150 years to bear the title of Great Supreme Patriarch.

Lists of Cambodian patriarchs

Supreme Patriarch of Maha Nikaya

Supreme Patriarch of Dhammayuttika Nikaya

Head of the Unified Sangha of Cambodia

Supreme Patriarch of Cambodia in exile 

Note: In 1988, Maha Ghosananda was elected Supreme Patriarch by a group of exiled monks in Paris.  During this same period, Tep Vong held the same office in the unified Cambodian sangha. After 1991, Tep Vong was recognized as head of the Maha Nikaya in Cambodia.

Great Supreme Patriarch of Cambodia

Notes

References

External links 
A website with information about each Supreme Patriarch

See also
 Agga Maha Pandita
 Buddhism in Cambodia
 Mahanayaka
 Sangharaja
 Sangha Supreme Council
 State Saṅgha Mahā Nāyaka Committee
 Supreme Patriarch of Thailand
 Thathanabaing of Burma

Buddhism in Cambodia